The Tourey was a French automobile manufactured by Jules Tourey only in 1898. A 4 hp model called the "Petit Duc", it was similar to the Benz.

References
David Burgess Wise, The New Illustrated Encyclopedia of Automobiles.

Defunct motor vehicle manufacturers of France